Myrmecotypus is a genus of ant mimicking corinnid sac spiders first described by O. Pickard-Cambridge in 1894. Species mainly occur from Panama to Mexico, with one species found in the United States, and one in Argentina.

M. rettenmeyeri, named after entomologist Carl Rettenmeyer, has an unusual longitudinal band of black hairs extending along the midline of the cephalothorax, enhancing its resemblance to Camponotus sericeiventris, an ant it shares a habitat with. The black hairs correspond to the solid longitudinal keel-like dorsal extensions of the posterior sections of the ant's thorax.

Species
 it contains fourteen species in North, Central, and South America:
Myrmecotypus fuliginosus O. Pickard-Cambridge, 1894 (type) – Mexico
Myrmecotypus haddadi Perger & Rubio, 2021 – Bolivia
Myrmecotypus iguazu Rubio & Arbino, 2009 – Bolivia, Argentina
Myrmecotypus jasmineae Leister & Miller, 2014 – Nicaragua
Myrmecotypus lineatipes Chickering, 1937 – Panama
Myrmecotypus lineatus (Emerton, 1909) – USA
Myrmecotypus niger Chickering, 1937 – Panama, Bolivia, Brazil
Myrmecotypus olympus Reiskind, 1969 – Panama, Brazil
Myrmecotypus orpheus Reiskind, 1969 – Panama
Myrmecotypus pilosus (O. Pickard-Cambridge, 1898) – Mexico, Panama
Myrmecotypus rettenmeyeri Unzicker, 1965 – Panama
Myrmecotypus rubioi Pett & Perger, 2021 – Bolivia
Myrmecotypus rubrofemoratus Perger & Rubio, 2021 – Bolivia
Myrmecotypus tahyinandu Perger & Rubio, 2020 – Bolivia

References

External links

Myrmecotypus at BugGuide
Pictures of M. lineatus

Araneomorphae genera
Corinnidae
Spiders of North America
Spiders of South America